Brzeźno Człuchowskie railway station is a railway station serving the village of Brzeźno Człuchowskie, in the Pomeranian Voivodeship, Poland. The station is located on the Chojnice–Runowo Pomorskie railway. The train services are operated by Przewozy Regionalne.

There used to be a railway between Brzeźno Człuchowskie and Wierzchowo Człuchowskie but this has now been dismantled.

Train services
The station is served by the following service(s):

Regional services (R) Słupsk — Miastko — Szczecinek — Chojnice
Regional services (R) Szczecinek — Chojnice

References 

Brzeźno Człuchowskie article at Polish Stations Database, URL accessed at 7 March 2006

Railway stations in Pomeranian Voivodeship
Człuchów County